The 1991–92 Cypriot Fourth Division was the 7th season of the Cypriot fourth-level football league. The championship was split into three geographical groups, representing the Districts of Cyprus. The winners were:
 Nicosia-Keryneia Group: OXEN Peristeronas
 Larnaca-Famagusta Group: Livadiakos Livadion
 Limassol-Paphos Group: AEZ Zakakiou

The three winners were promoted to the 1992–93 Cypriot Third Division. Seven teams were relegated to regional leagues.

See also
 Cypriot Fourth Division
 1991–92 Cypriot First Division
 1991–92 Cypriot Cup

Cypriot Fourth Division seasons
Cyprus
1991–92 in Cypriot football